is a 1957 Japanese film directed by Tadashi Imai. It was entered into the 8th Berlin International Film Festival where Imai won the Silver Bear for Best Director.

Cast
 Shinjirō Ehara as Hayakawa Kantaro
 Hitomi Nakahara
 Eiji Okada
 Isao Kimura
 Yoshi Katō
 Seiji Miyaguchi
 Eijirō Tōno
 Toshiko Kobayashi
 Michiko Araki
 Teruko Kishi
 Junkichi Orimoto as Detective
 Teruko Nagaoka

References

External links

1957 films
Japanese crime drama films
1950s Japanese-language films
Films directed by Imai Tadashi
1950s Japanese films